The following highways are numbered 22A:

United States
Maryland Route 22A
 New York State Route 22A
 County Route 22A (Allegany County, New York)
 County Route 22A (Oswego County, New York)
 County Route 22A (Ulster County, New York)
 Tennessee State Route 22A
 Vermont Route 22A
 Secondary State Highway 22A (Washington) (former)